Ofisa Ofisa (born April 6, 1974 in Apia, Samoa), also known as Ofisa Junior Asiata, is a Samoan Oceania and South Pacific Games Champion in weightlifting and powerlifting.

He won four Oceania Championships, two South Pacific Games Championships (1991 and 1999) and has set numerous Oceania and South Pacific records. At one time he held 5 South Pacific records in two different weight classes. In his final appearance at the 2002 Commonwealth Games he got a silver in the "clean and jerk" and a bronze in the "total" for the 85 kg class. Ofisa competed in the 1996 and 2000 Summer Olympics, placing 18th in the 76 kg in 1996 and the 85 kg in 2000.

Since 2007 he has been competing in the sport of powerlifting. He placed 4th at the 2007 South Pacific Games in the 100 kg class and 3rd in the Commonwealth Powerlifting Championships held that same year. He again placed 4th in the 100 kg class at the Oceania Championships held in Tahiti in 2008 but finally broke through to win in the 2010 Oceania Champs held in Apia, Samoa. He also won the 2011 Pacific Games 105 kg powerlifting gold medal with a raw 740 kg total. In 2012 he again won the Oceania powerlifting championships held in Sydney but this time in the 93 kg class.

After retiring for two years after the 2012 Oceania Championships, Ofisa made a comeback in late 2014 and won a silver medal in the 93 kg class at the Oceania Powerlifting Championships held in Melbourne. In 2015 he retained his Pacific Games crown but now in the lighter 93 kg category.

References

External links
 

1974 births
Living people
Samoan male weightlifters
Olympic weightlifters of Samoa
Weightlifters at the 1996 Summer Olympics
Weightlifters at the 2000 Summer Olympics
Weightlifters at the 2002 Commonwealth Games
Weightlifters at the 1994 Commonwealth Games
Commonwealth Games bronze medallists for Samoa
Commonwealth Games silver medallists for Samoa
Sportspeople from Apia
Commonwealth Games medallists in weightlifting
Medallists at the 2002 Commonwealth Games